Po Lam is a neighbourhood in Tseung Kwan O, New Territories, Hong Kong.

Po Lam may also refer to:
Po Lam (constituency), a constituency in Sai Kung District
Po Lam Estate, a public housing estate in Tseung Kwan O
Po Lam station, a MTR station on the Tseung Kwan O line